Dmitry Andreyevich Mironov (born October 22, 1992, in Chelyabinsk) is a Russian curler from Sochi.

As a junior curler, Mironov played second for Team Russia at two World Junior Curling Championships on teams skipped by Evgeny Arkhipov. At the 2013 World Junior Curling Championships, playing at home in Sochi, the team took home the silver medal. He again represented Russia at the 2014 World Junior Curling Championships, and the team placed 7th.

Mironov represented Russia at the men's level for the first time at the 2019 World Men's Curling Championship, playing second on the team, which was skipped by Sergey Glukhov. The team would finish the event in 9th place.

On the World Curling Tour, Mironov has won the 2018 China Open (as a skip) and the 2019 Red Square Classic, playing second.

References

External links

Living people
1992 births
Russian male curlers
Sportspeople from Chelyabinsk
Sportspeople from Sochi
Curlers at the 2022 Winter Olympics
Olympic curlers of Russia